Ktery A is a village in the administrative district of Gmina Krzyżanów, within Kutno County, Łódź Voivodeship, in central Poland.

The village has a population of 160.

References

Ktery A